William Seymour Robertson (20 April 1907 – 1980) was a Scottish footballer who played at right half. He played for King's Park, Ayr United, Stoke City, Manchester United, and Reading.

Career
Robertson was born in Falkirk and played for King's Park and Ayr United before joining English side Stoke City in August 1929. It took him until 1930–31 to establish himself in Tom Mather's first team playing in 23 matches. He made the right half position his own in 1931–32 missing just two matches and then played in 40 matches in 1932–33 as Stoke won the Second Division title. After playing in 11 Football League First Division games in 1933–34 Robertson lost his place to the younger Arthur Tutin and he was sold to Manchester United in March 1934. He helped the club avoid relegation to the Third Division North and played 39 matches in 1934–35 as the "Red Devils" finished in 5th place. He only played once in 1935–36 losing his place to James Brown and was sold to Third Division South side Reading. He spent two seasons at Elm Park making 24 appearances before retiring.

Career statistics
Source:

Honours
Ayr United
 Scottish Division Two champions: 1927–28

 Stoke City
 Football League Second Division champions: 1932–33

 Manchester United
 Football League Second Division champions: 1935–36

References

External links
 MUFCInfo.com profile

1907 births
Scottish footballers
King's Park F.C. players
Ayr United F.C. players
Stoke City F.C. players
Manchester United F.C. players
Reading F.C. players
1980 deaths
Association football wing halves
Footballers from Falkirk
English Football League players
Scottish Football League players